The New York-style bagel is the original style of bagel available in the United States, originating from the Jewish community of New York City, and can trace its origins to the bagels made by the Ashkenazi Jews of Poland.

A traditional New York-style is typically larger and fatter than a mass-produced bagel, or a wood-fired Montreal-style bagel.

History

As Jewish refugees from Poland and Eastern Europe began to arrive in New York City en masse in the 1800s, they brought their traditional foods with them such as challah, brisket, knishes, and bagels. For many decades, bagels were little known outside of the Jewish community, where their popularity was widespread. Bagels became so popular among the Jewish community of New York, that unions were formed to represent bagel bakers in the city, such as Bagel Bakers Local 338, which by the early 1910s represented over 300 bagel craftsman in Manhattan.

New York-style bagels are the original bagel available in the United States.  Although various cities spanning the globe have their own distinct style of cooking and serving bagels, the concept of the bagel originated on the Lower East Side, in Manhattan, New York.  The bagel was created as a filling, tasty, inexpensive treat for Jewish immigrants living in Manhattan in the 1800s.  The bagel quickly spread around New York City, across the United States, and was soon adapted in various forms across the world. The idea of a bagel in its modern-day form is native to New York City, particularly the Jewish community there.

Beginning in the 1960s, the popularity of the New York-style bagel began to increase with the non-Jewish population of New York City and beyond. Over the decades the size of the New York-style bagel increased from around 3 ounces to the more commonly found 6 ounces sizes today.

Texture and flavor

Many people claim the main difference in taste and texture of a real New York bagel compared to other styles of bagels, is due to the use of New York City tap water, which contains certain minerals which they attribute to creating a better bagel, specifically the low concentrations of calcium and magnesium found in New York water, which makes the water softer. NYC municipal water also has a high level of TDS, or sediment, and this also makes the water softer which has been claimed to strengthen the gluten in the bagel dough, helping to create the chewy on the inside, crispy on the outside bagel that represents a New York-style bagel.

Christopher Pugliese, owner of a popular bagel shop in the East Village attributes the New York-style bagel's signature taste to "100% the water". The use of New York City water in a bagel has been compared to the terroir of grape varietals used to make champagne.

Conversely, Peter Shelsky, co-owner of Shelsky's Brooklyn Bagels firmly believes that it is not the water.  According to Mr. Shelsky, "New Jersey and Long Island, both are dotted with fantastic NY style bagels.  Both New Jersey and Long Island have different water supplies, and that water has vastly different composition to that of New York City proper.  A great bagel with the right texture can be made anywhere.  It's not the water. It's the know-how."

However, the use of New York tap water in the bagel-making process may not be the only reason for the difference in texture and flavor in a NY bagel compared to other styles of bagel, according to Josh Polack, owner of a bagel shop in Denver, Colorado which tries to mimic the water used in New York-style bagels:

Preparation
A New York-style bagel is always boiled in water that has had barley malt added, which gives a bagel its signature taste, texture, and leathery skin. The bagels are then traditionally topped with sesame seeds, poppy seeds, dried onion or garlic, or everything bagel seasoning, or are left plain or brushed with an egg wash. These are the traditional flavors of NY style bagels, there are also newer, less traditional flavors such as rainbow, and other sweet bagels, but these originated in the 1950s and ’60s, and are not traditional and have been criticized by New Yorkers and members of the Jewish community, and have even been called a shonda.

The bagels are then loaded onto burlap-covered cedar or pine boards which have been wetted down with water, or sometimes coated with cornmeal or semolina, and are then baked in the oven. Halfway through the cooking process, the baker takes the boards and flips the bagels over and removes the boards from the oven. The bagels are then removed and allowed to cool.

Serving
A fresh New York-style bagel is traditionally never toasted.

Bagel with lox and schmear

According to Jewish culinary historian Gil Marks, the Jewish community in New York City developed the bagel with lox and schmear in the 1930s as a kosher adaption of eggs benedict, which Jewish people are unable to eat due to eggs Benedict both containing pork and mixing dairy and meat (both of which are violations of kashrut, Jewish dietary law). This was unique to the Jews of New York City, as Jewish communities in Poland had traditionally spread schmaltz on their bagels, or had eaten them with cholent, or other various soups and as a dinner roll.

See also
 Cuisine of New York City

References

Ashkenazi Jewish culture in New York City
Bagels
Bagel
Jewish American cuisine